Daniella Karagach Pashkova (née Karagach) is an American dancer. Karagach and dance partner Leonid Juashkovsky are three-time United States junior I and II Latin champions. They were the 2007 junior II 10 dance champions. Abroad, they reached the finals in the Celtic Classic, Moscow Open and Barcelona Open. Karagach and Juashkovsky were the United States representatives to the World Championships in Latvia, Russia and Barcelona. They appeared on seasons 2 and 3 of America's Ballroom Challenge on PBS. She became a professional dancer on Dancing with the Stars in 2019, winning her first Mirrorball trophy in her third season with celebrity partner Iman Shumpert.

Career
Karagach began a dance partnership with Pasha Pashkov in January 2009. Together, they are seven-time United States 10-Dance Champions and Latin Champions. Karagach and Pashkov were selected to represent the U.S. at the 2009 World Games in Taiwan. They made the semifinal in the world championship, taking place in Spain. They represented the U.S. at the 10 Dance World Championship in Austria, the Ballroom World Championship in Germany in November 2010 and the World Cup in Korea.

In 2011, they represented the U.S. at the World 10 Dance Cup in Szombathely, Hungary (June 2011), World Latin Championship in Singapore (September 2011), World Ballroom Championship in Moscow, Russia (Oct. 2011), as well as the Ten Dance World Championship in Shanghai, China (November 2011). In October 2011, they won the UK Open Ten Dance Championship, which took place in London.

In 2012 they became the U.S. dance national Latin champions. In 2012, they  made the semifinal of the Blackpool Dance Festival.

They were featured in the touring shows Dancing Pros (2014) and Dance Legends (2015).

In 2017, after turning professional in the Latin Dancesport division, Karagach and Pashkov won the Blackpool (British Open) Rising Star Professional championship, as well as the UK Open Rising Star Professional championship. In 2018, they won the U.S. Latin American Showdance Championship.

In 2018, Karagach and Pashkov appeared together on NBC's 2nd season of World of Dance.

In 2022, Karagach and Pashkov choreographed for Fox’s So You Think You Can Dance.

Dancing with the Stars (2019 - present) 
Karagach became one of the professional ballroom dancers on the 28th season of Dancing with the Stars, on ABC television, though she did not have a celebrity partner this season.

On the 29th season of Dancing with the Stars, Karagach was paired up with Grammy Award-winning rapper Nelly for her second season as a pro dancer. They made it to the finals and placed 3rd.

On the 30th season of Dancing with the Stars, Karagach was paired with professional basketball player Iman Shumpert. Shumpert is the only NBA player to make it to the Dancing with the Stars finals and win.

On the 31st season of Dancing with the Stars, Karagach was paired with actor, professional bodybuilder, and son of Arnold Schwarzenegger, Joseph Baena. They were eliminated 5th and placed in 11th of the competition.

Season 29: with celebrity partner Nelly (Average: 23.5/30)

Season 30: with celebrity partner Iman Shumpert (Average: 32.6/40) 

Notes:
1. Scores were given by Julianne Hough due to Derek Hough's COVID-19 diagnosis

Season 31: with celebrity partner Joseph Baena (Average: 28.3/40) 

Notes:
 Karagach tested positive for COVID-19, so Baena performed with Alexis Warr for weeks 2 & 3.

Personal life 
Daniella Brittany Karagach was born and raised in Brooklyn, New York by a single mother, Regina Karagach (nee Gershkovich). Her parents are both Jewish, born in the former Soviet Union Republic of Moldavia, now Moldova. Her parents divorced when she was one. Daniella began to take ballet lessons at the age of 3. She went on to study Latin dance at 6, and ballroom dance at 11. She attended public school and graduated from Franklin D. Roosevelt High School in Brooklyn, NY. She went on to study at the City University of New York at the Staten Island Campus. Daniella began dating her dance partner, Pasha Pashkov. The two were married on July 18, 2014. In 2020, Karagach and Pashkov announced their plan to launch WeddingDance.School, a platform geared towards engaged couples looking to learn various wedding dances before their wedding. Karagach and Pashkov are expecting a daughter in May 2023.

References

External links

  

Living people
American female dancers
1992 births
21st-century American women
Dancing with the Stars (American TV series) winners